Daku Ramkali is a Hindi-language action drama film of Bollywood directed by Kanti Shah and produced by Gulab Seikh. This film was released on 18 February 2000 in the banner of Gulab Pictures.

Plot
Sher Singh and Arjun Singh are identical twin brothers. Arjun is an honest police officer, but Sher Singh becomes a dacoit under the influence of Bajrang and his gang. Sher Singh's daughter Champa and Arjun Singh's daughter Raamkali are also twins. Bajrang's goon Dhanraj kills Arjun Singh, and he falsely blames on Sher Singh. Sher Singh becomes imprisoned and escapes from jail. Although he tries to kill Dhanraj but Dhanraj kills him. In the meantime, Champa falls in love with Dhanraj's son Shankar who is a police also. Raamkali want to take revenge her father Arjun's death and target Dhanraj.

Cast
 Sapna (actress) as Daku Ramkali
 Shakti Kapoor as Abu Alu
 Mohan Joshi as Dhanraj
 Kiran Kumar as Arjun/ Sher singh
 Sadashiv Amrapurkar as Bajrang
 Joginder
 Rajesh Vivek
 Rami Reddy (actor)
 Anil Nagrath
 Razzak Khan
 Ishrat Ali

References

External links
 

2000s Hindi-language films
Indian action drama films
Indian rape and revenge films
Films about outlaws
Indian films about revenge
2000 action drama films
2000 films
Films directed by Kanti Shah